Eric N'Jo (born 1 June 2004) is a French professional footballer who plays as a centre-back for Troyes.

Career
N'Jo moved to the youth academy of Troyes in 2017, and was promoted to their reserves in 2022. He made his professional debut with Troyes in a 1–0 Ligue 1 loss to Nice on 24 August 2022, coming on as a substitute in the 71st minute. On 9 June 2022, he signed a professional contract with the club, signing a 3-year agreement.

Personal life
Born in France, N'Jo is of Cameroonian descent.

References

External links
 
 

2004 births
Living people
Sportspeople from Sens
French footballers
French sportspeople of Cameroonian descent
ES Troyes AC players
Ligue 1 players
Championnat National 3 players
Association football defenders
Footballers from Bourgogne-Franche-Comté